Václav "Vinny" Prospal (born February 17, 1975) is a Czech former professional ice hockey player, currently a hockey coach. He played 16 seasons in the National Hockey League (NHL) for the Philadelphia Flyers, Ottawa Senators, Florida Panthers, Tampa Bay Lightning, Mighty Ducks of Anaheim, New York Rangers and Columbus Blue Jackets. On January 24, 2014, he announced his retirement from professional hockey. He is currently serving as the manager of Motor České Budějovice in the Czech hockey league.

Playing career
Prospal was drafted by the Philadelphia Flyers in the 1993 NHL Entry Draft, third round, 71st overall. While with the Flyers, Prospal suffered a fractured arm during the 1997 playoffs. Prospal and another player collided during the Flyers' practice session. During the 1997–98 season, Prospal, who was named to the 1998 Czech Olympic hockey team, broke his leg while fighting for the puck with Lance Pitlick during a game with the Ottawa Senators; Prospal was unable to play in the 1998 Winter Olympics. Prospal was traded to the Senators a few months later. During the 2004–05 lockout, Prospal played for his hometown team HC České Budějovice, leading them in scoring and helping the team return to the Czech Extraliga.

At the beginning of the 2007–08 season, while with the Lightning, Prospal posted 12 goals and 10 assists making it his best career start. On February 25, 2008, Prospal was dealt back to the Flyers for defenseman Alexandre Picard and a 2009 second-round draft pick.

On June 18, 2008, the Lightning acquired the rights to Prospal in exchange for the Nashville Predators' seventh-round pick (previously acquired), 196th overall, in the 2008 NHL Entry Draft. The Lightning signed Prospal to a four-year contract on June 30, in a deal worth $14 million overall to the player.

On July 28, 2009, Prospal was bought out from the remaining three years of his contract with the Lightning and became a free agent. On August 16, 2009, Prospal signed a one-year, $1.1 million contract with the New York Rangers. He was named an alternate captain of the Rangers on November 3, 2009. On July 1, 2010, Prospal was re-signed by the Rangers to another one-year deal worth $2.1 million. After he was not re-signed in 2011, he agreed to a 1-year $1.75 million deal with the Columbus Blue Jackets in the summer of 2011, followed by one-year, $2.5 million contract for the 2012–13 season, after which Prospal announced his retirement from professional hockey.

Post-hockey career
Prospal worked as a scout for the New York Rangers until the end of the 2013–14 season. He currently lives with his wife and four children in Tampa, Florida. He also served as an assistant coach for the Czech national team in the World Cup of Hockey in September 2016. Now He is Manager of HC České Budějovice in Czech Extraliga.

Career statistics

Regular season and playoffs

International

See also
List of NHL players with 1000 games played

References

External links

 

1975 births
Columbus Blue Jackets players
Czech ice hockey left wingers
Czech ice hockey coaches
Florida Panthers players
Motor České Budějovice players
Hershey Bears players
Ice hockey players at the 2006 Winter Olympics
Living people
Medalists at the 2006 Winter Olympics
Mighty Ducks of Anaheim players
New York Rangers players
Olympic bronze medalists for the Czech Republic
Olympic ice hockey players of the Czech Republic
Olympic medalists in ice hockey
Ottawa Senators players
Sportspeople from České Budějovice
Philadelphia Flyers draft picks
Philadelphia Flyers players
Philadelphia Phantoms players
Tampa Bay Lightning players
Czech expatriate ice hockey players in the United States
Czech expatriate ice hockey players in Canada
Czechoslovak ice hockey left wingers